Villa rustica was the term used by the ancient Romans to denote a farmhouse or villa set in the countryside and with an agricultural section, which applies to the vast majority of Roman villas. In some cases they were at the centre of a large agricultural estate, sometimes called a latifundium. The adjective rustica was used only to distinguish it from a much rarer sub-urban  resort villa, or otium villa built for purely leisure and luxury, and typically located in the Bay of Naples. The villa rustica would thus serve both as a residence of the landowner and his family (and servants) and also as a farm management centre. It would often comprise separate buildings to accommodate farm labourers and sheds and barns for animals and crops.

The villa rustica's design differed, but usually it consisted of two parts; the pars urbana (main house), and the pars rustica (farm area).

List of villae rusticae

Austria
  , Altheim, Austria

Bosnia-Herzegovina
 Mogorjelo

Bulgaria 
 Villa Armira, Ivaylovgrad

Italy

 Villa Boscoreale

 Villa dei Volusii, Fiano Romano

Portugal 

 
 Castelo da Lousa
 
 Roman Villa of Rabaçal
 Roman ruins of Quinta da Abicada
 Centum Cellas
 Villa of Torre de Palma
 Villa of Cerro da Vila
 Roman ruins of Pisões
 Roman ruins of São Cucufate
 Roman Ruins of Milreu (Estoi)
 Roman Villa of Sendim

Turkey

 Gökkale
 Üçayaklı ruins

United Kingdom

 Bignor Roman Villa
 Borough Hill Roman villa
 Brading Roman Villa
 Chedworth Roman Villa
 Crofton Roman Villa
 Fishbourne Roman Palace
 Gadebridge Park Roman Villa
 Littlecote Roman Villa
 Llantwit Major Roman Villa
 Low Ham Roman Villa
 Lullingstone Roman Villa
 Newport Roman Villa
 North Leigh Roman Villa
 Piddington Roman Villa
 Woodchester Roman Villa

France 
 Villa Rustica, Coustaty
 
 
 Montmaurin

Germany

Baden-Württemberg
 Villa Rustica, Baden-Baden-Haueneberstein, Roman settlement at Wohlfahrtsberg
 Villa Rustica at Bondorf, Böblingen
 , Konstanz
 , Lörrach
 Villa Rustica at Eigeltingen
 Villa Rustica at Gaggenau-Bad Rotenfels / Oberweier
 Villa urbana at Grenzach-Wyhlen (Museum Römervilla)
 , Zollernalbkreis
 Villa urbana at Heitersheim
 , Sigmaringen
 Villa Rustica at Hirschberg
 , Sigmaringen
 Villa Rustica at Karlsruhe-Durlach
 Villa Rustica at Langenau
 , Sigmaringen
 , Heilbronn
 Villa Rustica at Mühlacker
 Villa Rustica at Nagold
 
 Villa Rustica at Oberndorf-Bochingen
 , Rems-Murr-Kreis
 , Heilbronn
 , Rhein-Neckar-Kreis
 , Tuttlingen
 , Heilbronn
 Villa Rustica Bietigheim-Weilerlen at Bietigheim-Bissingen, Ludwigsburg

Bavaria

 
 , Stadt München
 
 Villa Rustica at Großberghofen, Dachau
 , Donau-Ries
 Villa Rustica at Hüssingen
 Villa Rustica Kohlhunden, Ostallgäu
 , Stadt Starnberg
  (Naturpark Altmühltal)
 Villa Rustica (Nassenfels), Eichstätt
 , Freising
 
 , Ingolstadt
 Villa Rustica (Peiting), Weilheim-Schongau
 
 , Oberallgäu

Hesse

 Groß-Umstadt-Heubach, 
 , Odenwald
 Rodau, Zwingenberg, "Kleine Weide"

Northrhine-Westphalia

 
 Villae Rusticae at Eschweiler, Aachen
 , Eschweiler, Aachen
 Villae Rusticae near Hambach surface mine, Düren
  at Sollig, Nettersheim-Roderath, Euskirchen

Rheinland-Palatine

 , Bad Dürkheim-Ungstein
 , Bad Kreuznach
 
 , Eifelkreis Bitburg-Prüm
 , Fließem, Eifelkreis Bitburg-Prüm
 Villa Rustica at Sarresdorf (Gerolstein)
, Mainz-Bingen
 Villa Rustica at Herschweiler-Pettersheim, Kusel
 
 
  (Mosel), Trier-Saarburg
 
 , Mainz-Bingen
 , Trier-Saarburg

Saarland

 Roman Villa Borg
 Reinheim
 Roman villa at Nennig

Serbia
 Village Gornja Bukovica.Valjevo, villa rustica IV century A.D.

Switzerland

Aargau
 
 
 
 

Basel-Landschaft
 

Genf
 

Jura
 

Solothurn
 

 
Waadt
 

Zürich
 Irgenhausen Castrum (built on the remains of a former villa rustica)
 Villa in Wetzikon - Kempten

References

External links
 Villa Rustica - open-air museum at Hechingen (Germany)

 
Architectural history